Gonario Gianoglio (1 January 1932 – 13 October 2021) was an Italian politician. A member of the Christian Democracy party, he served as Mayor of Nuoro from 1964 to 1969 and in the Regional Council of Sardinia from 1973 to 1979.

References

1932 births
2021 deaths
Christian Democracy (Italy) politicians
Mayors of Nuoro
Members of the Regional Council of Sardinia
20th-century Italian politicians